Joseph-Alfred Serret (August 30, 1819 – March 2, 1885) was a French mathematician who was born in Paris, France, and died in Versailles, France.

See also
Frenet–Serret formulas

Books by J.-A. Serret
 Traité de trigonométrie (Gautier-Villars, 1880)
 Cours de calcul differentiel et integral t. 1 (Gauthier-Villars, 1900)
  Cours de calcul differentiel et integral t. 2 (Gauthier-Villars, 1900)
 Cours d'algèbre supérieure. Tome I (Gauthier-Villars, 1877)
 Cours d'algèbre supérieure. Tome II (Gauthier-Villars, 1879)

External links 
 
 

1819 births
1885 deaths
19th-century French mathematicians
École Polytechnique alumni
Members of the French Academy of Sciences
Differential geometers